Money is an unincorporated community near Greenwood in Leflore County, Mississippi, United States, in the Mississippi Delta. It has fewer than 100 residents, down from 400 in the early 1950s when a cotton mill operated there. Money is located on a railroad line along the Tallahatchie River, a tributary of the Yazoo River in the eastern part of the Mississippi Delta. The community has ZIP code 38945 in the Greenwood, Mississippi micropolitan area.

Money is the site of events leading to the 1955 lynching of 14-year-old Emmett Till.

History

The settlement was named for Hernando Money, a United States Senator from Mississippi. Money was a stop on the Yazoo and Mississippi Valley Railroad. This rural area was developed for cotton cultivation. The population in 1900 was 40. The Money post office was established in 1901. 

Money gained international attention in 1955 after Emmett Till, a 14-year-old African-American boy from Chicago visiting his uncle, was accused of flirting with a white woman working alone at Bryant's Grocery in Money.  Till was subsequently murdered. A vandalized historical marker is located at the site of the abandoned grocery store.

Education
It is in the Greenwood-Leflore School District. Residents are zoned to Amanda Elzy High School.

The town was formerly served by the Leflore County School District. Effective July 1, 2019 this district consolidated into the Greenwood-Leflore School District.

Notable people
Richard "Hacksaw" Harney – Delta blues guitarist and pianist
James Schaffer – religious leader and centenarian.
Willye White – Olympic athlete.

In popular culture
A wooden bridge across the Tallahatchie River at Money was the focus of Bobbie Gentry's 1967 hit song "Ode to Billie Joe." The November 10, 1967 issue of Life magazine featured a photo of Gentry crossing the bridge. The bridge collapsed in June 1972 after being burned by vandals. It has since been replaced.

References

Unincorporated communities in Mississippi
Unincorporated communities in Leflore County, Mississippi
Greenwood, Mississippi micropolitan area
 Emmett Till